"Chapter Four: Dear Billy" is the fourth episode of the fourth season of the American science fiction horror drama television series Stranger Things. It was written by Paul Dichter and directed by Shawn Levy. The episode was released on May 27, 2022 on Netflix, alongside the six other episodes comprising volume 1 of the season.

Set on March 24, 1986, "Dear Billy" centers on Max Mayfield's mental struggles, and her attempt to survive Vecna's preying. The episode received critical acclaim and was noted as a standout of the season. Particular praise went to Max's storyline and Sadie Sink's performance, the use of Kate Bush's "Running Up That Hill" during the episode's climax, and the themes of depression and suicide. Critics also praised the guest appearance of Robert Englund as well as Dichter's writing and Levy's directing, the latter most notably for a long take sequence.

Plot 
After Eleven accepts Sam Owens' offer to retrieve her powers again, Owens sends Agents Stinson, Harmon, and Wallace to inform Mike Wheeler and Will and Jonathan Byers that, while Eleven will complete her training, they are confined to the Byers home in Lenora Hills, California, with Harmon and Wallace providing guard.

Meanwhile, in Hawkins, Indiana, Max Mayfield informs her friends that she fears Vecna is targeting her as his next victim. While Dustin Henderson, Lucas Sinclair, and Steve Harrington accompany Max as she writes and delivers goodbye letters for her friends and loved ones, Nancy Wheeler and Robin Buckley pose as university students to interview Victor Creel at Pennhurst Asylum. At Pennhurst, they discover that the Creels experienced supernatural occurrences and illusions at their home, with the horrors culminating in Victor's wife and children being murdered and his subsequent arrest. Nancy and Robin also discover that music was key to Victor's survival.

Elsewhere, Joyce Byers and Murray Bauman land in Alaska, where they deliver the ransom payment to Antonov's contact Yuri in exchange for Jim Hopper's release. But, he drugs them, planning to turn them, along with Hopper and Antonov, over to the Russians for a larger profit. In Russia, Hopper escapes the prison camp but is soon recaptured. 

Back in Lenora Hills, Mike, Will, and Jonathan begin plotting their escape back to Hawkins in order to warn their friends of what's happening. Yet, their plans are derailed when armed soldiers attack the Byers home, injuring Wallace, while Harmon protects them. With the help of Jonathan's friend Argyle, Mike, Will, and Jonathan escape, bringing a wounded Harmon with them.

After Max suffers another vision while speaking with her mother, she visits Billy Hargrove's grave to read her letter for him. She is soon possessed by Vecna, eventually finding herself at an altar within his mind. Lucas, Dustin, and Steve attempt to awaken her but to no avail. Nancy and Robin tell them that playing music breaks Vecna's control, and they play Max's favorite song, "Running Up That Hill", on Max's cassette player. This opens a portal within Max's mind, and after she recalls happy memories of her friends, Max is able to run toward the portal, narrowly escaping Vecna.

Reception 
On Rotten Tomatoes, the episode holds an approval rating of 100% based on 5 reviews, with an average rating of 9.0/10. 

The episode was included in many publications' list of best TV episodes of 2022. British GQ ranked it the second best episode of the year, Mashable SEA placed it at number five, TV Guide put it at number nine, and Mashable named it the 11th best, while Entertainment Weekly included it in its unranked list of "The 33 best TV episodes of 2022".

Impact 
The use of Kate Bush's "Running Up That Hill" during the episode's climax revived the popularity of the track, which topped the UK Singles Chart, and in a number of other countries: Australia, Belgium, Ireland, Lithuania, Luxembourg, New Zealand, Sweden, and Switzerland.

References

External links
 
 

Stranger Things episodes
Television episodes set in the 1970s
Television episodes set in the 1980s
Television episodes set in Alaska
Television episodes set in California
Television episodes set in Indiana
Television episodes set in Siberia
2022 American television episodes
Television episodes about demonic possession
Impact of the COVID-19 pandemic on television